Lucien Victor (28 June 1931 – 17 September 1995) was a road racing cyclist from Belgium. He won the gold medal in the men's team road race, alongside André Noyelle and Robert Grondelaers at the 1952 Summer Olympics. He was a professional rider from 1953 to 1956.

References

External links

1931 births
1995 deaths
Belgian male cyclists
Cyclists at the 1952 Summer Olympics
Olympic cyclists of Belgium
Olympic gold medalists for Belgium
Olympic medalists in cycling
People from Roeselare
Cyclists from West Flanders
Medalists at the 1952 Summer Olympics